Aubrey Gordon (born 1983), also known as Your Fat Friend, is an author, podcaster, and activist. She writes about fatness, fat acceptance, and anti-fat bias, and her podcast, Maintenance Phase, focuses on the poor science behind health and wellness fads.

Career 
Before beginning her writing career, Gordon was an LGBTQ community organizer.

After an argument with a friend about the differences between thin and fat people's relationships with their own bodies, Gordon wrote a letter to the friend to try to convey her thoughts. She shared it to a different friend to get feedback on whether the letter came off as rude, and her friend asked her to post it online so he could share it. Gordon, who was concerned about her professional reputation after beginning a new job, shared the letter anonymously with the name "Your Fat Friend". The letter was widely read, and Gordon decided to keep writing and posting essays about fatness, and hate and discrimination directed toward fat people.

Gordon writes a regular column for Self magazine. She also publishes essays on Medium, and has written for publications including Vox and The New York Times.

Gordon remained anonymous for five years. In October 2020, just before publishing her first book, she revealed her identity and began including her name in bylines.  The following month, she published the book What We Don't Talk About When We Talk About Fat, which focuses on fatness and anti-fat bias.

Since October 2020, Gordon and Michael Hobbes have co-hosted the podcast Maintenance Phase. They use the show to debunk the myths and "junk science" behind health, nutrition, and wellness trends, and have discussed topics including popular diets and diet foods, anti-fat bias, and eating disorders.

Personal life 
Gordon describes herself as "very fat". She identifies as queer. , she lived in Portland, Oregon.

References

External links 
 
 
 

1983 births
21st-century pseudonymous writers
21st-century American women writers
21st-century American non-fiction writers
Activists from Portland, Oregon
American podcasters
Fat acceptance activists
American LGBT rights activists
Living people
Pseudonymous women writers
Queer women
Queer writers
Writers from Portland, Oregon
21st-century LGBT people
American women podcasters